Justice Dawson may refer to:

Daryl Dawson (born 1933), justice of the High Court of Australia
John Shaw Dawson (1869–1960), justice of the Kansas Supreme Court

See also
Thomas Dawson, Lord Dawson (died 2007), judge of the Supreme Court of Scotland